The person from Porlock was an unwelcome visitor to Samuel Taylor Coleridge during his composition of the poem Kubla Khan in 1797. Coleridge claimed to have perceived the entire course of the poem in a dream (possibly an opium-induced haze), but was interrupted by this visitor from Porlock while in the process of writing it. Kubla Khan, only 54 lines long, was never completed. Thus "person from Porlock", "man from Porlock", or just "Porlock" are literary allusions to unwanted intruders who disrupt inspired creativity.

Story
In 1797, Coleridge was living at Nether Stowey, a village in the foothills of the Quantocks. However, due to ill health, he had "retired to a lonely farm house between Porlock and Lynton, on the Exmoor confines of Somerset and Devonshire". It is unclear whether the interruption took place at Culbone Parsonage or at Ash Farm. He described the incident in his first publication of the poem, writing about himself in the third person:

Speculations

If there were an actual person from Porlock, it could have been one of many people, including William Wordsworth, Joseph Cottle, or John Thelwall.

It has been suggested by Elisabeth Schneider (in Coleridge, Opium and "Kubla Khan", University of Chicago Press, 1953), among others, that this prologue, as well as the person from Porlock, was fictional and intended as a credible explanation of the poem's seemingly fragmentary state as published. The poet Stevie Smith also suggested this view in one of her own poems, saying "the truth is I think, he was already stuck".

Were the Porlock interruption a fiction, it would parallel the famous "letter from a friend" that interrupts Chapter XIII of Coleridge's Biographia Literaria just as he was beginning a 100-page exposition of the nature of the imagination. It was admitted much later that the "friend" was the author himself. In that case, the invented letter solved the problem that Coleridge found little receptiveness for his philosophy in the England of that time.

In other literature
 An important plot point in Dirk Gently's Holistic Detective Agency by Douglas Adams involves a time traveller interrupting Coleridge and claiming to be from Porlock.
 In Richard S. Prather's The Kubla Khan Caper, a knock at the door prompts Shell Scott to say "I'll bet it's the man from Porlock".
Robert Graves's The Person from Porlock regrets that Coleridge's visitor had not called on more poets.
 A. D. Hope's poem Persons from Porlock uses Porlock as a trope for the vapid mediocrity that is the enemy of poetry.
 Stevie Smith's poem "Thoughts About the Person from Porlock" begins as a gentle ribbing of Coleridge and ends in a meditation on loneliness, creativity, and depression. 
 Vincent Starrett, Persons from Porlock & Other Interruptions (1938)
 "The Person from Porlock" is a science fiction story by Raymond F. Jones published in Astounding magazine in 1947.
 Louis MacNeice, Persons from Porlock, and other plays for radio (1969)
 The True Confessions of Adrian Albert Mole; the diarist writes "I woke with an epic poem thundering inside my head... I was interrupted once when a visitor called from Matlock".
 During the Inspector Morse episode "Twilight of the Gods", Morse refers to his sergeant, Lewis, as the Person from Porlock, due to his interrupting Morse's crossword attempts. Lewis retorts "No Sir, Newcastle" in his Geordie accent.
 In Arthur Conan Doyle's The Valley of Fear, Sherlock Holmes makes use of an informant referred to as 'Porlock' to gain information on Professor Moriarty's activities.
 In The Thrilling Adventures of Lovelace and Babbage by Sydney Padua, the story conceives that the person from Porlock was Ada Lovelace, who interrupted Coleridge deliberately as part of her attempts to fight crime, which she considers poetry to be.
 In the TV series Studio 60 on the Sunset Strip, Matt Albie uses the story of the man from Porlock and Kubla Khan to inspire his writers to a "4 AM Miracle", which is also the name of the episode.
 In Vladimir Nabokov's novel Lolita, "A. Person, Porlock" is a member of the trail of pseudonyms Clare Quilty leaves on motel registries.
 In Robert A. Heinlein's novel Stranger in a Strange Land, when a member of staff comes to tell Jubal Harshaw that he has a telephone call, he responds "Anne, you have just interrupted a profound thought. You hail from Porlock."
 In Neil Gaiman's graphic novel The Sandman (Vertigo), a character named Etain forgets a poem shortly after waking up and remarks how lucky Samuel Coleridge was to be able to get down 55 "killer lines" before being distracted by the man from Porlock.

References

18th-century English people
English poetry
People from West Somerset (district)
People whose existence is disputed
Unidentified people
Samuel Taylor Coleridge